Velebit Pumped Storage Power Plant is a pumped-storage power plant in Croatia that has two turbines with a nominal capacity of  each, having a total capacity of . , it was one of three operational pumped-storage power plants in Croatia.

The plant was designed by Elektroprojekt, Projektni Biro and Geoexpert, and constructed by Industrogradnja, Konstruktor, Hidroelektra, Pomgrad and Geotehnika.

Turbines
type: single-stage turbine-pump
units: 2
turbine design head: 
design pumping head: 
turbine rating: 
installed discharge: - turbine (2x), - pump (2x)

References

Sources

http://www.koncar-ket.hr/dokumenti/rhe-velebit-zamjena-opreme-sust-%20uprav.pdf 
http://www.pbs.hr/index.php?option=com_content&task=view&id=9&Itemid=4 
http://www.koncar-ket.hr/dokumenti/Numericka%20zattita%20motor%20generatora%20u%20RHE%20Velebit.pdf 
http://www.ie-zagreb.hr/clanci/clanciPDF/2003HKCigre/A1-12.pdf 
http://www.gradri.hr/dokumenti/pgit/15-Okna.pdf 

Energy infrastructure completed in 1984
Hydroelectric power stations in Croatia
Pumped-storage hydroelectric power stations
Buildings and structures in Zadar County